The 1950 season was FC Steaua București's 3rd season since its founding in 1947.

This year the club changed the name again, for the third season in a row. It changed to CCA București (Casa Centrală a Armatei – Central House of the Army).

Divizia A

League table

Results 

Source:

Cupa României

Results

See also

 1950 Cupa României
 1950 Divizia A

Notes and references

External links
 1950 FC Steaua București matches

FC Steaua București seasons
1949–50 in Romanian football
1950–51 in Romanian football
Steaua, București
Steaua, București
Steaua
Steaua